This article lists the episodes of The George Burns and Gracie Allen Show, an American situation comedy television series that ran for eight seasons (1950–58) on CBS. The show did not become weekly until the third season.  The first two seasons of the show were biweekly broadcasts, with the last episode of Season Two broadcast three weeks after the one that preceded it.

Series overview

Episodes
There were 291 episodes over 8 seasons.

Season 1 (1950–51)

Season 2 (1951–52)

Season 3 (1952–53)

Season 4 (1953–54)
Season 4:

Season 5 (1954–55)

Season 6 (1955–56)
Season 6 was a departure from all the previous seasons set in Beverly Hills, California. During Season 6, the Burnses, the Mortons and Harry Von Zell are based in New York while Ronnie tries his hand as a stage actor.

Season 7 (1956–57)

Season 8 (1957–58)

References

External links
 Finding Aid for the Rod Amateau Papers, 1955–1966, including scripts for The George Burns and Gracie Allen Show. UCLA Library Special Collections, Performing Arts, The Online Archive of California.
 

Lists of American sitcom episodes
George Burns
Gracie Allen